The 2006–07 Welsh Premier League was the 15th season of the Welsh Premier League since its establishment as the League of Wales in 1992. It began on 18 August 2006 and ended on 21 April 2007. The league was won for the third consecutive season by The New Saints, their fourth title overall.

League table

Results

Top goalscorers

Source: www.welsh-premier.com

Monthly awards

Sources:

Notes

External links
Welsh Premier League

Cymru Premier seasons
1
Wales